Amara convexior is a species of ground beetle native to Europe.

References

convexior
Beetles described in 1828
Beetles of Europe